Michael James Ruth (born 8 January 2002) is a Scottish professional footballer who plays as a striker for Queen of the South. Ruth has previously played for Queen's Park and Aberdeen, as well as loan spells with Arbroath and Falkirk.

Early and personal life
Ruth was born in Glasgow.

Career
After progressing through their youth academy, Ruth debuted for Queen's Park on 31 March 2018 versus Airdrieonians and had ten league appearances for the Spiders, scoring one goal.

Ruth signed for Scottish Premiership club Aberdeen on a two-year contract in June 2019. Ruth signed a one-year contract extension with the Dons in September 2020 and joined Scottish Championship club Arbroath on a season-long loan deal. The loan was curtailed on 1 February 2021, as the Dons made several squad changes.

Ruth was loaned to Falkirk in September 2021.

On 14 June 2022, after his contract expired at the Dons, Ruth signed a one-year contract for Queen of the South.

Career statistics

References

External links

2002 births
Living people
Scottish footballers
Footballers from Glasgow
Association football forwards
Queen's Park F.C. players
Aberdeen F.C. players
Arbroath F.C. players
Scottish Professional Football League players
Falkirk F.C. players
Queen of the South F.C. players